This is a list of Greek place names as they exist in the Greek language.

Places involved in the history of Greek culture, including:
Historic Greek regions, including:
Ancient Greece, including colonies and contacted peoples
Hellenistic world, including successor states and contacted peoples
Roman Empire and Byzantine Empire, including successor states
Ottoman Empire, including successor states
Septinsular Republic
Modern Greece and Cyprus, and also what remains of treaty Greek minorities in Turkey
Places that have or had important Greek-speaking or ethnic Greek minorities or exile communities
Places of concern to Greek culture, religion or tradition, including:
Greek mythology
Greek Jews, including Romaniotes and exiled Sephardim
Greco-Buddhism
Christianity until the Great Schism, and afterwards the Eastern Orthodox Church, Eastern Rite, etc.
Greek Muslims, and those outside Greece who are Greek-speaking or ethnic Greek
Places whose official names include a Greek form.
Places whose names originate from the Greek language, even if they were never involved in Greek history or culture.

Αlthough this list includes toponyms from Roman times, this list does not include later wholly Latin-derived names that have (nor had) no Greek linguistic involvement, involvement with the Greek world, nor significant Greek-speaking communities. (A notable exception may be places such as Australia, which has one of the largest modern Greek-speaking communities outside Greece and Cyprus.) However, much of the Roman Empire did have significant Greek-speaking communities, as Greek had been a popular language among the Roman elite from the beginning.

Both koine and modern forms and transliterations (including polytonic spellings) are listed if available. This list is incomplete, and some items in the list lack academic detail.

As a historical linguistics article, this list is an academic lexicon for the history of Greek place names, and is not a formal dictionary nor gazetteer and should not be relied upon as such.

Indeed, many toponyms in Modern Greek now have different names than were used in by Greek-speaking communities in the past. An example is Malta, which was called  (Melítē) and was once home to a Greek-speaking community.

However, in other cases, Modern Greek has retained archaic names (sometimes with grammatical modifications).

Distinctly Greek names are also largely retained for places without significant modern Greek populations that had a larger Greek-speaking presence until relatively recent times in history, including many areas in what are now Turkey, Egypt, Russia and Ukraine.

Format
The names presented are in Classical Greek spelling, specifically of the Attic dialect, scientific transliteration of Classical Greek, standard Modern Greek, the United Nations transliteration for Modern Greek, and the Modern Greek pronunciation in the International Phonetic Alphabet.

The list

Α

Β

Γ

Δ

Ε

Ζ

Η

Θ

Ι

Κ

Λ

Μ

Ν

Ξ

Ο

Π

Ρ

Σ

Τ

Υ

Φ

Χ

Ψ

Ω

See also
 Geographical name changes in Greece

Greek traditional place names
Placename
Place names